Joanne Wood (born 23 December 1985) is a Scottish professional mixed martial artist and former Muay Thai champion who competed in the Women's Flyweight division of the Ultimate Fighting Championship.

Biography
Wood first started Muay Thai training by accident. When she was 13, her younger brother was meant to go to a class with his friend, who did not turn up.  Her mother asked her to go to keep him company. She fell in love with it and begged her mother to allow her to give up competitive swimming to do the two classes each week. This led to doing two sessions a day and spending all of her time training on her own between these sessions.

She worked several jobs growing up, including one after secondary school that involved her helping children and people who were on ventilation machines, monitoring them in the hospital and assisting them when needed. But those were 12-hour shifts, which drained energy and made training difficult. She eventually found another gym, left that job to work at the gym and made a significant commitment to her training. "I had to make a decision if I wanted to keep fighting or stay in my job," she said. "I wanted to keep fighting."

Muay Thai
Wood started in Muay Thai in 2000 and was named STBA Fighter of the year in 2009. She is the current ISKA World Flyweight Champion, IKF European Flyweight Champion, the WKL European Flyweight Champion, and the WBC UK Bantamweight Champion, and is ranked #2 in the world by the World Professional Muaythai Federation. Her final Muay Thai fight was in September 2012 and she had earned a record of 19-2-0.

Mixed martial arts career
Wood is Scotland's first professional female mixed martial artist. She won her debut bout against Noellie Molina via TKO from punches in the first round.

She next fought at India's Super Fight League's third event, SFL 3, against Lena Ovchynnikova. She won the fight via unanimous decision.

Wood then competed at On Top 5, defeating Ainara Mota via TKO from punches.

Invicta Fighting Championships and Cage Warriors Fighting Championships
She next competed at Invicta Fighting Championships' third event, Invicta FC 3: Penne vs. Sugiyama, against Ashley Cummins on 6 October 2012. Wood won the fight via knockout from a knee to the body in the first round. She was awarded a Knockout of the Night bonus for the victory.

Wood was scheduled to face Bec Hyatt at Invicta FC 4: Esparza vs. Hyatt on 5 January 2013 in Kansas City. However, Hyatt was moved to the main event and Wood was instead matched up against Livia von Plettenberg. Wood won the fight via unanimous decision. This was Wood's debut on the main card of an Invicta FC event.

At Cage Warriors Fighting Championship 53 on 13 April 2013 in Glasgow, Scotland, Wood faced American Sally Krumdiack. She defeated Krumdiack by first-round TKO.

Wood was scheduled to face undefeated BJJ black belt Claudia Gadelha at Invicta FC 6: Coenen vs. Cyborg on 13 July 2013, but Gadelha was moved into a fight against Ayaka Hamasaki after Carla Esparza suffered an injury. Wood was then set to face Sarah Schneider. On 23 June, Schneider also withdrew due to injury and was replaced by Norma Rueda Center. Wood defeated Rueda Center via unanimous decision.

On 7 December 2013, Wood faced Katja Kankaanpää at Invicta FC 7: Honchak vs. Smith. She won the fight via unanimous decision.

Ultimate Fighting Championship

The Ultimate Fighter
On 11 December 2013, it was announced that Wood was signed by the UFC along with ten other strawweight fighters to compete on season 20 of The Ultimate Fighter, which will crown the first-ever UFC women's strawweight champion. She defeated Emily Kagan by majority decision after two rounds to advance to the quarterfinals. She was defeated by Rose Namajunas in the quarterfinals via kimura in the second round.  Despite her loss in the semifinal round fight, Wood was awarded a $25,000 Fight of the Season bonus for this bout.

After TUF
Wood's first fight after The Ultimate Fighter was against Seo Hee Ham at The Ultimate Fighter: A Champion Will Be Crowned Finale on 12 December 2014. She won the fight by unanimous decision.

Wood faced promotional newcomer Maryna Moroz on 11 April 2015 at UFC Fight Night 64. She lost the fight as she was quickly submitted via armbar in the first round, making this the first official loss on her professional record. 

Wood's next fight was expected to be against Bec Rawlings at UFC Fight Night 72 on 18 July 2015. However, Rawlings pulled out of the bout due to an injury and was replaced by promotional newcomer Cortney Casey. After being rocked by punches and nearly finished in the first round, she rallied back to win the next two rounds to earn a unanimous decision victory.

Wood was expected to face Paige VanZant on 10 December 2015 at UFC Fight Night 80. However, Wood was pulled from the fight on 28 October and replaced by Rose Namajunas.

Wood next faced Valérie Létourneau at UFC Fight Night: MacDonald vs. Thompson in the first women's flyweight bout in UFC history. She won the fight via TKO in the third round after striking Létourneau with a kick to the body and finishing her off with punches.

Wood faced Jéssica Andrade in a strawweight bout on 10 September 2016 at UFC 203. She lost the fight via submission in the first round.

Wood faced Cynthia Calvillo in a strawweight bout on 16 July 2017 at UFC Fight Night 113. At the weigh-ins, Wood came in at 118 lbs, two pounds over the strawweight limit of 116 lbs. As a result, she will be fined 20% of her purse, which will go to Calvillo and their bout proceeded as scheduled at a catchweight. Wood lost the fight via unanimous decision.

Wood was, yet again, scheduled to face Bec Rawlings, in a flyweight bout at UFC Fight Night: Werdum vs. Tybura on 19 November 2017. However, on 7 November, it was announced that Wood withdrew from the event due to injury. She was replaced by promotional newcomer Jessica Rose-Clark.

Wood faced Kalindra Faria on 25 August 2018 at UFC Fight Night 135. She went on to win the fight via submission in the first round.

Wood faced promotional newcomer Ariane Lipski on 19 January 2019 at UFC Fight Night 143. She won the fight by unanimous decision.

Wood faced Katlyn Chookagian on 8 June 2019 at UFC 238. She lost the fight by a controversial unanimous decision.

Wood faced Andrea Lee on 9 September 2019 at UFC 242. She won the fight via split decision.

Wood was scheduled to face Valentina Shevchenko on 6 June 2020 for the UFC Women's Flyweight Championship at UFC 251. However, Shevchenko pulled out of the fight on 31 March citing a leg injury and the bout was postponed.

Wood stepped in on short notice for Viviane Araújo to face Jennifer Maia on 1 August 2020 at UFC Fight Night: Brunson vs. Shahbazyan. She lost the fight via armbar submission in round one.

After the fight, Wood passed out backstage when getting checked out in the medical room. She was transported to a local hospital. Her heart rate dropped on the way there, but later stabilized.

Wood faced Jessica Eye on 24 January 2021  at UFC 257. She won the fight via unanimous decision.

Wood faced Lauren Murphy on 12 June 2021 at UFC 263. She lost the fight via split decision.

As the first bout of her new, multi-fight contract, Wood was scheduled to face Alexa Grasso on 20 November 2021 at UFC Fight Night 198. However, Grasso was forced to pull out from the event due to injury and she was replaced by Taila Santos. She lost the bout via rear-naked choke at the end of the first round.

Wood faced Alexa Grasso in a re-scheduled bout on 26 March 2022 at UFC on ESPN 33. She lost the fight via a rear-naked choke in the first round.

Wood faced Luana Carolina on March 18, 2023 at UFC 286. She won the bout via split decision.

Personal life
Wood was previously engaged to her former coach James Doolan until 2015. She became engaged to Syndicate MMA head coach John Wood in October 2019, and the couple were married in October 2021.

She took up residence in Las Vegas in March 2018, having previously lived and trained in Montreal.

Championships and accomplishments

Kickboxing
International Kickboxing Federation
IKF European Flyweight (53.2 kg / 117 lb) Championship
International Sport Karate Association
ISKA World Flyweight (-51.8 kg / 114 lb) Championship
Scottish Thai Boxing Association
2009 STBA Fighter of the Year
World Boxing Council Muaythai
WBC Muaythai British Flyweight (-50.8 kg / 112 lb) Championship
World Kickboxing League
WKL European Flyweight Championship

Mixed martial arts
Ultimate Fighting Championship
 Fight of the Night (One Time) vs. Cortney Casey
Women's MMA Press Awards
2014 Fan Favorite Fighter of the Year
2012 Newcomer of the Year

Kickboxing record

|-
|-  bgcolor="#CCFFCC"
| 2012-09-02 || Win ||align=left| Jenny Krigsman || Oran Mor VII || Glasgow, Scotland || TKO (stoppage) || 4 || || 19-2
|-
! style=background:white colspan=9 |
|-
|-  bgcolor="#CCFFCC"
| 2011-09-11 || Win ||align=left| Sally McCarthy || Muay Thai Supershow|| Poole, England || Decision (unanimous) || 5 || 3:00 || 18-2
|-
! style=background:white colspan=9 |
|-
|-  bgcolor="#CCFFCC"
| 2011-06-18 || Win ||align=left| Laetitia Lambert || Hostile Intentions 4 || Hamilton, Scotland || TKO || 4 || || 17-2
|-
|-  bgcolor="#FFBBBB"
| 2011-00-00 || Loss ||align=left| Alexis Rufus || Shin Kick Promotions || Woking, England || Decision || 5 || || 16-2
|-
! style=background:white colspan=9 |
|-
|-  bgcolor="#CCFFCC"
| 2010-11-13 || Win ||align=left| Karla Benitez || || Barcelona, Spain || Decision || || || 16-1
|-
! style=background:white colspan=9 |
|-
|-  bgcolor="#FFBBBB"
| 2010-08-11 || Loss ||align=left| Melissa Ray || Queen's Birthday Celebrations || Bangkok, Thailand || Decision (split) || || ||
|-
! style=background:white colspan=9 |
|-
|-  bgcolor="#CCFFCC"
| 2010-05-01 || Win ||align=left| Ferial Ameeroedien || Power of Scotland 8 || Glasgow, Scotland || || || ||
|-
|-  bgcolor="#CCFFCC"
| 2009-09-13 || Win ||align=left| Maria Curriki || Oran Mor III || Glasgow, Scotland || Decision || 5 || 2:00 ||
|-
! style=background:white colspan=9 |
|-
|-  bgcolor="#CCFFCC"
| 2009-05-09 || Win ||align=left| Michelle Preston || Ladykillers III || Manchester, England || Decision (unanimous) || 5 || 2:00 ||
|-
|-  bgcolor="#CCFFCC"
| 2008-09-14 || Win ||align=left| Christi Brereton || Oran Mor || Glasgow, Scotland || Decision || 5 || 2:00 || 
|-
|-  bgcolor="#CCFFCC"
| 2008-07-13 || Win ||align=left| Pam McCarthy || Master A's Show || Manchester, England || TKO || 3 || || 
|-
|-  bgcolor="#CCFFCC"
| 2008-05-18 || Win ||align=left| Simona Soukupova || Woking Fight Night || Woking, England || Decision || || || 
|-
|-  bgcolor="#CCFFCC"
| 2007-09-23 || Win ||align=left| Zoe Green || September Showdown || Motherwell, Scotland || Decision || 5 || || 
|-
|-  bgcolor="#CCFFCC"
| 2006-05-28 || Win ||align=left| Kirsty Mack || Chaos in Kirkintilloch || Kirkintilloch, Scotland || || || || 
|-
|-  bgcolor="#CCFFCC"
| 2005-07-16 || Win ||align=left| Trish Carson || STBA || Barrhead, Scotland || Decision || || || 
|-
|-  bgcolor="#CCFFCC"
| 0000-00-00 || Win ||align=left| || Bang Klang Stadium || Bangkok, Thailand || TKO || 4 || || 
|-
|-  bgcolor="#CCFFCC"
| 0000-00-00 || Win ||align=left| Sophie Bowyer || || || TKO || 1 || || 
|-
|-  bgcolor="#CCFFCC"
| 0000-00-00 || Win ||align=left| Pat Strachan || || Scotland || TKO || 3 || || 
|-
|-
| colspan=9 | Legend:

Mixed martial arts record

|Win
|align=center|16–8
|Luana Carolina
|Decision (split)
|UFC 286
|
|align=center|3
|align=center|5:00
|London, England
|
|-
|Loss
|align=center|15–8
|Alexa Grasso
|Submission (rear-naked choke)
|UFC on ESPN: Blaydes vs. Daukaus
|
|align=center|1
|align=center|3:57
|Columbus, Ohio, United States
|
|-
|Loss
|align=center|15–7
|Taila Santos
|Submission (rear-naked choke)
|UFC Fight Night: Vieira vs. Tate
|
|align=center|1
|align=center|4:49
|Las Vegas, Nevada, United States
|
|-
|Loss
|align=center|15–6
|Lauren Murphy
|Decision (split)
|UFC 263 
|
|align=center|3
|align=center|5:00
|Glendale, Arizona, United States
|
|-
|Win
|align=center|15–5
|Jessica Eye
|Decision (unanimous)
|UFC 257
|
|align=center|3
|align=center|5:00
|Abu Dhabi, United Arab Emirates
|
|-
|Loss
|align=center|14–5
|Jennifer Maia
|Submission (armbar)
|UFC Fight Night: Brunson vs. Shahbazyan 
|
|align=center|1
|align=center|4:29
|Las Vegas, Nevada, United States
|
|-
|Win
|align=center|14–4
|Andrea Lee
|Decision (split)
|UFC 242 
|
|align=center|3
|align=center|5:00
|Abu Dhabi, United Arab Emirates
|
|-
|Loss
|align=center|13–4
|Katlyn Chookagian
|Decision (unanimous)
|UFC 238 
|
|align=center|3
|align=center|5:00
|Chicago, Illinois, United States
|
|-
|Win
|align=center|13–3
|Ariane Lipski
|Decision (unanimous)
|UFC Fight Night: Cejudo vs. Dillashaw 
|
|align=center|3
|align=center|5:00
|Brooklyn, New York, United States
|
|-
|Win
|align=center|12–3
|Kalindra Faria
|Submission (triangle armbar)
|UFC Fight Night: Gaethje vs. Vick 
|
|align=center|1
|align=center|4:57
|Lincoln, Nebraska, United States
|
|-
|Loss
|align=center|11–3
|Cynthia Calvillo
|Decision (unanimous)
|UFC Fight Night: Nelson vs. Ponzinibbio 
|
|align=center|3
|align=center|5:00
|Glasgow, Scotland
|
|-
|Loss
|align=center|11–2
|Jéssica Andrade
|Submission (guillotine choke)
|UFC 203
|
|align=center|1
|align=center|4:38
|Cleveland, Ohio, United States
|
|-
|Win
|align=center|11–1
|Valérie Létourneau
|TKO (body kick and punches)
|UFC Fight Night: MacDonald vs. Thompson
|
|align=center|3
|align=center|2:51
|Ottawa, Ontario, Canada
|
|-
|Win
|align=center|10–1
|Cortney Casey
|Decision (unanimous)
|UFC Fight Night: Bisping vs. Leites
|
|align=center|3
|align=center|5:00
|Glasgow, Scotland
|
|-
|Loss
|align=center|9–1
|Maryna Moroz
|Submission (armbar)
|UFC Fight Night: Gonzaga vs. Cro Cop 2
|
|align=center|1
|align=center|1:30
|Kraków, Poland
|
|-
|Win
|align=center|9–0
|Ham Seo-hee
|Decision (unanimous)
|The Ultimate Fighter: A Champion Will Be Crowned Finale
|
|align=center|3
|align=center|5:00
|Las Vegas, Nevada, United States
|
|-
|Win
|align=center|8–0
|Katja Kankaanpää
|Decision (unanimous)
|Invicta FC 7: Honchak vs. Smith
|
|align=center|3
|align=center|5:00
|Kansas City, Missouri, United States
|
|-
|Win
|align=center|7–0
|Norma Rueda Center
|Decision (unanimous)
|Invicta FC 6: Coenen vs. Cyborg
|
|align=center|3
|align=center|5:00
|Kansas City, Missouri, United States
|
|-
|Win
|align=center|6–0
|Sally Krumdiack
|TKO (punches)
|Cage Warriors Fighting Championship 53
|
|align=center|1
|align=center|3:08
|Glasgow, Scotland
|
|-
|Win
|align=center|5–0
|Livia von Plettenberg
|Decision (unanimous)
|Invicta FC 4: Esparza vs. Hyatt
|
|align=center|3
|align=center|5:00
|Kansas City, Kansas, United States
|
|-
|Win
|align=center|4–0
|Ashley Cummins
|TKO (knee to the body)
|Invicta FC 3: Penne vs. Sugiyama
|
|align=center|1
|align=center|3:13
|Kansas City, Kansas, United States
|
|-
|Win
|align=center|3–0
|Ainara Mota
|TKO (punches)
|On Top 5
|
|align=center|2
|align=center|2:46
|Glasgow, Scotland
|
|-
|Win
|align=center|2–0
|Lena Ovchynnikova
|Decision (unanimous)
|SFL 3
|
|align=center|3
|align=center|5:00
|New Delhi, India
|
|-
|Win
|align=center|1–0
|Noellie Molina
|TKO (punches)
|On Top 4
|
|align=center|1
|align=center|3:13
|Glasgow, Scotland
|
|-

Mixed martial arts exhibition record

|-
|Loss
|align=center|1–1
| Rose Namajunas
| Submission (kimura)
| rowspan=2| The Ultimate Fighter: A Champion Will Be Crowned
| (airdate)
|align=center|2
|align=center|2:05
| rowspan=2| Las Vegas, Nevada, United States
|
|-
|Win
|align=center|1–0
| Emily Kagan
| Decision (majority)
| (airdate)
|align=center|2
|align=center|5:00
|

See also

 List of female mixed martial artists

References

External links

Year of birth missing (living people)
Sportspeople from Irvine, North Ayrshire
Female Muay Thai practitioners
Living people
Scottish female mixed martial artists
Flyweight mixed martial artists
Strawweight mixed martial artists
Mixed martial artists utilizing Muay Thai
Mixed martial artists utilizing Brazilian jiu-jitsu
Scottish practitioners of Brazilian jiu-jitsu
Scottish Muay Thai practitioners
Scottish female kickboxers
Flyweight kickboxers
Ultimate Fighting Championship female fighters
Scottish expatriates in Canada
Scottish expatriates in the United States